Martin Joseph Crue Jr. (September 14, 1919 – July 14, 1994) was an American Negro league pitcher in the 1940s.

A native of Mobile, Alabama, Crue made his Negro leagues debut in 1942 with the New York Cubans. In 1945, he played for the New York Black Yankees, but returned to the Cubans from 1946 to 1948, playing on their 1947 Negro World Series championship team. Following his Negro leagues career, Crue played for the Elmwood Giants of the Mandak League in 1950. He died in Miami, Florida in 1994 at age 74.

References

External links
 and Seamheads

1919 births
1994 deaths
New York Black Yankees players
New York Cubans players
20th-century African-American sportspeople
Baseball pitchers